The Canton of Arras-Ouest is a former canton situated in the department of the Pas-de-Calais and in the Nord-Pas-de-Calais region of northern France. It was disbanded following the French canton reorganisation which came into effect in March 2015. The canton comprised part of the commune of Arras. It had a total of 21,404 inhabitants (2012).

See also
Cantons of Pas-de-Calais 
Communes of Pas-de-Calais 
Arrondissements of the Pas-de-Calais department

References

Arras-Ouest
Arras
2015 disestablishments in France
States and territories disestablished in 2015